The Piot Madonna is a c.1440 or c.1460 sculptural roundel by Donatello in stiacciato (polychrome terracotta with glass and wax inlays). It is in the Louvre after being donated to that museum in 1890 by Eugène Piot, after whom it is named.

Prior to 1890 its attribution had alternated between Donatello and his studio and its date had also been hotly debated. Produced for private devotion, its commissioner is unknown.

External links
http://cartelen.louvre.fr/cartelen/visite?srv=car_not_frame&idNotice=2304

1440 sculptures
1460 sculptures
Italian sculptures of the Louvre
Sculptures by Donatello
Terracotta sculptures
Statues of the Madonna and Child